Faith Heist is a Canadian television comedy heist film, directed by J.B. Sugar and released in 2021. The film stars Jonathan Langdon as Benjamin Wright, the pastor of an inner-city Black church, who enlists members of his congregation to pull off a heist to save the church after it is swindled out of all of its money by an unscrupulous financial advisor.

The film's cast also includes Dalmar Abuzeid, Sagine Sémajuste, Steve Lund, Marty Adams, Marium Carvell, Eden Cupid, Leah Doz, Okiki Kendall, Jaeden Noel, Aaron Poole and Nadine Roden. The film was shot in fall 2020 in Hamilton, Ontario.

The film premiered in April 2021 on Super Channel Heart & Home in Canada and Bounce TV in the United States.

Awards

References

External links

2021 films
2021 television films
Canadian crime comedy films
Canadian heist films
Canadian comedy television films
Black Canadian films
English-language Canadian films
Films shot in Hamilton, Ontario
Super Channel (Canadian TV channel) original programming
2020s Canadian films